The Vermont Wilderness Act of 1984 was signed into law by President Ronald Reagan on June 19, 1984. The Act designated four new wilderness areas in the U.S. state of Vermont, while expanding one existing wilderness area. The Act also created a new recreation area in Vermont.

The Act also added  to the Lye Brook Wilderness, which was created by the Eastern Wilderness Areas Act of 1975.

In addition to the wilderness areas listed above, the Act created the White Rocks National Recreation Area in the Green Mountain National Forest.

See also

 List of U.S. Wilderness Areas
 Wilderness Act
 New England Wilderness Act of 2006

References

United States federal public land legislation
Environmental law in the United States